The RWGŁ-3 is a non-lethal police rifle grenade launcher used to dispense tear gas, developed in the 1970s by a group of engineers from the Polish state-owned research institute OBR Radom.
In order to cut production costs it was designed around AKM assault rifle components. After several years' worth operational use of expensive RWGŁ-1 and failed RWGŁ-2 development project, in 1978 it became a standard-issue grenade launcher of Milicja Obywatelska and stays in use by current Policja.

Its regular ammunition is Polish UGŁ-200 canister with affecting mucous membranes CN gas, however use of East Germany RWK grenade was possible too.

In 1984 its capabilities were enhanced by SZO-84 adapter, effectively converting it into a netgun.

Basing on RWGŁ-3 a heavier automatic grenade launcher called "AWGŁ-3" was developed to be mounted on UAZ-469 and STAR trucks.

7.62×39mm firearms
Kalashnikov derivatives
Police weapons
Teargas grenade guns
Grenade launchers of Poland